General Shepherd or General Shephard may refer to:

Gordon Strachey Shephard (1885–1918), British Royal Flying Corps brigadier general
Leland C. Shepard Jr. (1923–2009), U.S. Air Force brigadier general
Lemuel C. Shepherd Jr. (1896–1990), U.S. Marine Corps four-star general
William Shepard (1737–1817), Continental Army general
Lieutenant General Shepherd, fictional character in the Call of Duty video game franchise

See also
Isaac F. Shepard (1816–1899), Union Army brigadier general-appointee not confirmed to that rank
 Rear Admiral Alan Shepard, American astronaut
Donald Shepperd (born 1940), U.S. Air Force major general
 Shepherd (name), including Shephard